Cedar Springs is a census-designated place and unincorporated community in Early County, Georgia, United States. At the time of the 2020 census, the population was 75. Cedar Springs has a post office with ZIP code 39832. Georgia State Route 273 passes through the community. Georgia Pacific is 2 miles southwest from it.

The community was so named on account of a number of mineral springs near the original town site.

Demographics

2020 census

Note: the US Census treats Hispanic/Latino as an ethnic category. This table excludes Latinos from the racial categories and assigns them to a separate category. Hispanics/Latinos can be of any race.

References

Populated places in Early County, Georgia
Census-designated places in Georgia (U.S. state)